Rumpology or bottom reading is a pseudoscience akin to physiognomy, performed by examining crevices, dimples, warts, moles and folds of a person's buttocks in much the same way a chirologist would read the palm of the hand.

History
The term rumpology is a neologism. The late American astrologer Jackie Stallone claimed that rumpology is known to have been practiced in ancient times by the Babylonians, the Indians, and the Ancient Greeks and Romans.

Theory and practice
Rumpologists have a variety of theories as to the meaning of different posterior characteristics. According to Stallone, the left and right buttocks reveal a person's past and future, respectively, although she has also commented that "The crack of your behind corresponds to the division of the two hemispheres of the brain". According to blind German clairvoyant and rumpologist Ulf Buck, an "apple-shaped, muscular bottom indicates someone who is charismatic, dynamic, very confident and often creative. A person who enjoys life. A pear-shaped bottom suggests someone very steadfast, patient and down-to-earth." The British rumpologist Sam Amos claims that "A round bottom indicates the person is open, happy and optimistic in life. However, a flat bottom suggests the person is rather vain and is negative and sad."

Rumpology can be performed either by sight, touch or by using buttock prints. In addition to live readings, Jackie Stallone performed buttock readings using e-mailed digital photographs, and has claimed to predict the outcome of Presidential elections and Oscar awards by reading the bottoms of her two pet Doberman Pinschers. Ulf Buck, who is blind, claims he can read people's futures by feeling their naked buttocks.

See also

 List of topics characterized as pseudoscience
 Phrenology

References

External links

 Rumpology from the Skeptic's Dictionary
 Rumpology on Jackie Stallone's webpage

Divination
Lower limb anatomy
Pseudoscience
Physiognomy
Neologisms
Buttocks